The 2011 Cork Senior Hurling Championship was the 123rd staging of the Cork Senior Hurling Championship since its establishment by the Cork County Board in 1887. The draw for the 2011 opening round fixtures took place on 11 December 2010. The championship proper began on 3 June 2011 and ended on 2 October 2011.

Sarsfields were the defending champions, however, they were defeated by Newtownshandrum in the quarter-finals.

On 20 August 2011, Ballinhassig were relegated from the championship following a 0-12 to 0-13 defeat by Bishopstown.

On 2 October 2011, Carrigtwohill won the championship following a 0-15 to 1-11 defeat of the Cork Institute of Technology in the final. This was their second championship title overall and their first since 1918.

Format change

The format of the 2011 championship was slightly altered due to a decrease in the number of divisional teams taking part. Carrigdhoun, Carbery and Seandún declined to field teams in the championship. The four remaining divisional teams competed in a preliminary round robin, with the top two teams qualifying to meet the two college teams for a place in the championship proper.

Team changes

To Championship

Promoted from the Cork Premier Intermediate Hurling Championship
 Ballymartle

From Championship

Relegated to the Cork Premier Intermediate Hurling Championship
 Blarney

Results

Divisions/colleges section

Group table

{| class="wikitable" style="text-align:center"
!width=20|
!width=150 style="text-align:left;"|Team
!width=20|
!width=20|
!width=20|
!width=20|
!width=30|
!width=30|
!width=20|
!width=20|
|- style="background:#ccffcc"
|1||align=left| Muskerry ||3||2||1||0||5-47||5-41||6||5
|- style="background:#ccffcc"
|2||align=left| Imokilly ||3||2||0||1||6-46||2-43||15||4
|- 
|3||align=left| Avondhu ||3||1||1||1||2-45||4-32||7||3
|- 
|4||align=left| Duhallow ||3||0||0||3||4-29||6-51||-28||0
|-|align=left|
|colspan="10" style="border:0px;font-size:85%;"| Green background The top two teams advanced to meet University College Cork and the Cork Institute of Technology for a place in the championship proper.
|}

Group stage results

Knock-out stage

Round 1

Round 2

Round 3

Relegation play-off

Fourth round

Quarter-finals

Semi-finals

Final

Championship statistics

Scoring statistics

Top scorers overall

Top scorers in a single game

Miscellaneous

 Carrigtwohill win the championship for the first time since 1918. The 93 year gap is the longest gap between successive championship titles.
 Cork Institute of Technology qualify for the championship final for the first time.

External links
 2011 championship results

References

Cork Senior Hurling Championship
Cork Senior Hurling Championship